The European University Film Award is one of the awards presented by the European Film Academy, it was first awarded at the 29th European Film Awards in 2016 and is presented and voted by European university students.

Background
The award was inspired by a model in Québec, the Prix collégial du cinéma québécois (PCCQ) and was launched by Filmfest Hamburg and the European Film Academy (EFA) in 2016 as the European University Film Award (EUFA). The creation of this initiative was to "involve a younger audience, to spread the "European idea" and to transport the spirit of European cinema to an audience of university students. It shall also support film dissemination, film education and the culture of debating".

For the first edition of the award 13 universities from 13 different European countries participated, the number has increased throughout the years with 20 participants in 2017, 22 in 2018 and 24 in 2019. For the 33rd European Film Awards, the participants were from 25 universities from 25 countries: Austria, Belgium, Czech Republic, Finland, France, Germany, Greece, Hungary, Iceland, Ireland, Israel, Italy, Kosovo, Latvia, Lithuania, Netherlands, Poland, Portugal, Romania, Russia, Serbia, Spain, Sweden, Switzerland, Turkey and United Kingdom.

Universities
The following universities participated in the 5th EUFA edition:

  – AAB College in Prishtina
  – Aarhus University in Aarhus
  – Charles University in Prague
  – Film University Babelsberg KONRAD WOLF in Potsdam
  – Kadir Has University in Istanbul
  – Latvian Academy of Culture in Riga
  – Linnaeus University in Växjö
  – Liverpool John Moores University in Liverpool
  – Pázmány Péter Catholic University in Budapest
  – Sapientia – Hungarian University of Transylvania in Cluj-Napoca
  – Tel Aviv University in Tel Aviv
  – University College Cork in Cork
  – University of Antwerp in Antwerp
  – University of Arts Belgrade in Belgrade
  – University of the Aegean in Lesbos
  – University of the Basque Country in Bilbao
  – University of Beira Interior in Covilhã
  – University of Iceland in Reykjavík
  – University of Lausanne in Lausanne
  – University of Lodz in Lodz
  – University of Oulu in Oulu
  – University of Paris III: Sorbonne Nouvelle in Paris
  – University of Udine in Udine
  – Utrecht University in Utrecht
  – Vilnius University in Vilnius

Winners and nominees

2010s

2020s

References

External links
European Film Academy archive

European Film Academy Awards
Awards established in 2016
2016 establishments in Europe